Kowalowa may refer to the following places in Poland:
Kowalowa, Lower Silesian Voivodeship (south-west Poland)
Kowalowa, Lesser Poland Voivodeship (south Poland)